= Authentic Indians =

2005 non-fiction book by Paige Raibmon

Authentic Indians: Episodes of Encounter from the Late-Nineteenth-Century Northwest Coast
- Author: Paige Raibmon
- Publisher: Duke University Press
- Publication date: 2005
- ISBN: 978-0-8223-3547-4

Authentic Indians: Episodes of Encounter from the Late-Nineteenth-Century Northwest Coast is a non-fiction book by Paige Raibmon. It was published in 2005 by Duke University Press.

== General references ==
- Blackhawk, Ned (2007). Wilkinson, Charles; Raibmon, Paige (eds.). "Native American Reversal of Fortune: American Indian Colonialism and Its Aftermath". American Quarterly. 59 (1): 211–218. ISSN 0003-0678.
- Boxberger, Daniel L. (2007). "Review of Authentic Indians: Episodes of Encounter from the Late-Nineteenth-Century Northwest Coast". Oregon Historical Quarterly. 108 (1): 141–143. ISSN 0030-4727.
- Dickason, Olive Patricia (2006). "Review of Authentic Indians: Episodes of Encounter from the Late-Nineteenth-Century Northwest Coast". The International History Review. 28 (3): 613–615. ISSN 0707-5332.
- Fisher, Andrew H. (2007-10-01). "Authentic Indians: Episodes of Encounter from the Late-Nineteenth-Century Northwest Coast". The Western Historical Quarterly. 38 (3): 383. doi:10.2307/25443571.
- Harkin, M. E. (2006-06-01). "Authentic Indians: Episodes of Encounter from the Late-Nineteenth-Century Northwest Coast". Journal of American History. 93 (1): 236–236. doi:10.2307/4486144. ISSN 0021-8723.
- Kan, Sergei (2009-01-01). "Authentic Indians: Episodes of Encounter from the Late Nineteenth-Century Northwest Coast". Ethnohistory. 56 (1): 207–209. doi:10.1215/00141801-2008-047. ISSN 0014-1801.
- Miller, B. G. (2006-10-01). "PAIGE RAIBMON. Authentic Indians: Episodes of Encounter from the Late-Nineteenth-Century Northwest Coast. (A John Hope Franklin Center Book.) Durham, N.C.: Duke University Press. 2005. Pp. xv, 307. Cloth $79.95, paper $22.95". The American Historical Review. 111 (4): 1161–1162. doi:10.1086/ahr.111.4.1161. ISSN 0002-8762.
- Shepherd, Jeffrey P. (2008). "Review of Authentic Indians: Episodes of Encounter from the Late-Nineteenth-Century Northwest Coast". Studies in American Indian Literatures. 20 (2): 128–130. ISSN 0730-3238.
- Vibert, Elizabeth (2007). "Review of Authentic Indians: Episodes of Encounter from the Late-Nineteenth-Century Northwest Coast". Labour / Le Travail. 60: 279–282. ISSN 0700-3862.
